Demetrida concinna is a species of ground beetle in Lebiinae subfamily. It was described by Blackburn in 1901 and is found in Australia.

References

Beetles described in 1901
Beetles of Australia
concinna